The 1988 NCAA basketball tournaments were the 64th year of the National Collegiate Athletic Association (Philippines)' basketball tournaments. The San Sebastian Stags won both rounds of elimination, becoming outright champions of the seniors' division; the San Beda Red Cubs also won both rounds in the juniors' division, with the JRU Light Bombers coming in second.

Seniors' tournament

Elimination round
Format:
Tournament divided into two halves: winners of the two halves dispute the championship in a best-of-3 finals series unless:
A team wins both rounds. In that case, the winning team automatically wins the championship.
A third team has a better cumulative record than both finalists. In that case, the third team has to win in a playoff against the team that won the second round to face the team that won in the first round in a best-of-3 finals series.

First round team standings

Second round team standings

Cumulative standings
San Sebastian won both pennants, and were named automatic champions without need for the finals.

In a rematch of the 1987 first round finale, San Sebastian prevailed over Letran 77–73 preventing a comeback from the Knights which cut the 38–58 SSC lead to a 2-point 71–73 deficit. Paul Alvarez tipped on a miss from a fellow Stag, but Letran's Robert Ruiz split his two free-throws to keep pace with SSC, 72–75. Marlon Bolabola put up a free-throw, then Melchor Teves grabbed the rebound, that led to Crizalde Bade converting two free-throws for SSC off a Jerry Ruiz foul.to put San Sebastian up for good 77–73.

In the penultimate second-round game for both teams, San Sebastian defeated Letran 85–84 as Eugene Quilban prevented Jerry Ruiz from catching the ball in a pick-and-roll attempt with 2.7 seconds left. With the Perpetual Altas needing to win to force a three-way tie for first, the Altas succumbed to a 14–4 SSC run with 5:20 to go in the second half to turn a 77–70 SSC lead to a 90–74 rout. The Stags held on to a 108–94 victory, clinching the second round pennant. With San Sebastian winning both halves of the elimination round, San Sebastian were named outright champions, their third league championship.

Juniors' tournament

Elimination round
Format:
Tournament divided into two halves: winners of the two halves dispute the championship in a best-of-3 finals series unless:
A team wins both rounds. In that case, the winning team automatically wins the championship.
A third team has a better cumulative record than both finalists. In that case, the third team has to win in a playoff against the team that won the second round to face the team that won in the first round in a best-of-3 finals series.

First round team standings
Season host is boldfaced.

Second round team standings
Season host is boldfaced.

Cumulative standings
Season host is boldfaced.

The San Beda Red Cubs won the first round pennant after a ten-point victory over the JRU Light Bombers, after trailing at halftime 33–39. Needing to win to force a playoff for the second round pennant, the Light Bombers fell short to the Red Cubs at the final game of the second round when John Henry Reyes split his free-throw at the final seconds of the game, giving San Beda a 1-point 92–91 victory.

See also
UAAP Season 51 men's basketball tournament

References

64
1988 in Philippine basketball